Dr. Earl S. Sloan House is a historic home located at Trent Woods, Craven County, North Carolina.  It was built in 1914, and is a -story brick dwelling, consisting of a main block and flanking pavilions under low, hipped slate roofs. It is a Colonial Revival style residence with Tudor Revival and Mediterranean style design influences.

It was listed on the National Register of Historic Places in 1986.

References

Houses on the National Register of Historic Places in North Carolina
Colonial Revival architecture in North Carolina
Tudor Revival architecture in North Carolina
Houses completed in 1914
Houses in Craven County, North Carolina
National Register of Historic Places in Craven County, North Carolina